Henry Matthews may refer to:
Henry Matthews, 1st Viscount Llandaff (1826–1913), British lawyer and Conservative politician
Henry Matthews (judge) (1789–1828), judge in Ceylon
Henry John Matthews (1859–1909), New Zealand nurseryman and forester
Henry George Matthews of HG Matthews Brickworks

See also
Harry Matthews (disambiguation)
Matthews (surname)